Italo Salice (born 20 February 1942) is an Italian diver. He competed in the men's 3 metre springboard event at the 1968 Summer Olympics.

References

1942 births
Living people
Italian male divers
Olympic divers of Italy
Divers at the 1968 Summer Olympics
Divers from Rome